The Totteridge Academy is a mixed secondary school and sixth form located in Barnet, North London, England.

History
Founded in 2016, The Totteridge Academy (also known as TTA) is part of the United Learning academy trust.

The TTA site formerly housed The Ravenscroft School.

In June 2022, The Totteridge Academy was one of four British schools shortlisted for the World’s Best School Prizes, run by an organisation called T4 Education. However, the school was not selected as one of the finalists.

References

External links
The Totteridge Academy official website

Secondary schools in the London Borough of Barnet
Academies in the London Borough of Barnet
Ravenscroft family
United Learning schools